Kelly West is a deeply eroded impact crater situated in the central Northern Territory, Australia. It was discovered during Government geological mapping and first reported in 1973, the evidence for impact coming principally from an abundance of shatter cones at the site.

Description 
The age is poorly constrained, but must be older than Middle Cambrian because sedimentary rocks of this age overlie the central uplift and were not deformed by the impact event.

See also

List of impact craters in Australia

References 

Impact craters of the Northern Territory
Proterozoic impact craters
Precambrian Australia
Geology of the Northern Territory